Hasmik (born Taguhi Hakobyan, 21 March 1878 – 23 August 1947) was a Soviet and Armenian actress.

Awards 
 People's Artist of the Armenian SSR (1935)
 Hero of Labour (1936)
 Order of the Red Banner of Labour (1945)

Partial filmography 
Evil Spirit (1927)
Gikor (1934)
Pepo (1935)
Zangezur (1938)
David Bek (1944)

References

External links

1878 births
1947 deaths
20th-century Armenian actresses
People from Nakhchivan
People's Artists of Armenia
Recipients of the Order of the Red Banner of Labour
Armenian film actresses
Armenian people from the Russian Empire
Armenian silent film actresses
Soviet Armenians
Soviet actresses